Printer's Park (spelled Printers Park by some sources) is a small park on Hoe Avenue between Aldus Street and Westchester Avenue, in the Longwood neighborhood of the Bronx, New York City. The park is run by the New York City Department of Parks and Recreation (NYC Parks).

The park's name (and the street it lies on) honors Richard March Hoe, who invented the Rotary printing press.  The land the park occupies was once part of Hoe's family estate.  The cross-street, Aldus Street, is named after Aldus Manutius, a 15th-century printer.

NYC Parks acquired the site in 1997.   The northern portion of the park was renovated in 2001; the name was changed to Printer's Park at that time.  In 2009, the southern portion of the park was reconstructed at a cost of $1 million, and the park was officially reopened on July 29, 2010.  The renovation included play structures reminiscent of the printing press heritage.

Gallery

External links 

 New York City Green Infrastructure Practices: Sustainable Streets & Parks.  James Mituzas, Landscape Architect, City of New York Parks & Recreation.  Pages 44-55 (Printers Park Playground, The Bronx, New York: The Bronx River Watershed).  Presentation on the design of the park infrastructure.

Notes

References

Longwood, Bronx
Parks in the Bronx
Printing in the United States